Brittainey Raven (born August 1, 1988) is an American professional basketball player in the WNBA.  She is a graduate of North Crowley High School and of the University of Texas at Austin.  She was drafted as the 33rd overall pick in the 2010 WNBA draft by the Atlanta Dream, the team she most recently played for.

Texas statistics

Source

USA Basketball
Raven was a member of the USA Women's U18 team which won the gold medal at the FIBA Americas Championship in Colorado Springs, Colorado. The event was held in July 2006, when the USA team defeated Canada to win the championship. Raven averaged 3.3 points per game over the course of the event.

References

External links
 WNBA Playerfile
 Texas Longhorns Player Bio

1988 births
Living people
American women's basketball players
Atlanta Dream draft picks
Atlanta Dream players
Basketball players from Texas
Guards (basketball)
McDonald's High School All-Americans
Parade High School All-Americans (girls' basketball)
People from Crowley, Texas
Sportspeople from the Dallas–Fort Worth metroplex
Texas Longhorns women's basketball players